Papworth may refer to:

 Manor of Papworth, Ripley, Surrey, England
 Papworth Everard, a village in Cambridgeshire, England
 Papworth Hospital, a heart and lung hospital in Papworth Everard
 Papworth method, a diaphragmatic breathing technique developed at Papworth Hospital
 Papworth Industries, the manufacturing arm of Papworth Village Settlement
 The Story of Papworth, a 1935 British short drama film focused on a tuberculosis patient and his treatment at Papworth Village Settlement

People with the surname
 Brett Papworth (born 1963), Australian rugby league player
 Edgar George Papworth Senior (1809–1866), English sculptor
 Edgar George Papworth Junior (1832–1927), English sculptor
 George Papworth (1781–1855), English architect; brother of John Buonarotti Papworth
 Jack Papworth (1894–1942), English footballer
 John Papworth (1921–2020), English journalist
 John Buonarotti Papworth (1775–1847), English architect; brother of George Papworth and father of John Woody Papworth
 John Woody Papworth (1820–1870), English architect and heraldic antiquary; son of John Buonarotti Papworth; compiler of Papworth's Ordinary, often cited simply as "Papworth"
 Sir William Papworth (c.1331–1414), English Member of Parliament
 Wyatt Papworth (1822–1894), English architect, son of John Buonarotti Papworth